Kingscote and Horsley Woods is a  biological Site of Special Scientific Interest in Gloucestershire, notified in 1966. The site (Kingscote Woods Complex, including Conygre Wood, Sandgrove Wood and Fishponds Wood) is listed in the 'Cotswold District' Local Plan 2001-2011 (on line) as a Key Wildlife Site (KWS).

Location
The woods are in the Cotswold Area of Outstanding Natural Beauty and there are two units of assessment. There are four separately named woods in the citation being Kingscote, Horsley, Sandgrove and Fishponds.

Woodland type
The site is an example of ancient Beech woodland, which is typical of the Jurassic limestone of the west Cotswolds.  Kingscote, Horsley and Sandgrove woods are similar and includes some Ash and Oak.  The woodland understorey is Hazel and Hawthorn.  These are Bluebell woods with Wood Garlic, Wood Anemone and Dog's Mercury.

Fishponds Wood, as its names implies, includes a pond area, and is a regenerated woodland, having been previously felled. Ground flora includes Small Teasel.

References

SSSI Source
 Natural England SSSI information on the citation
 Natural England SSSI information on the Kingscote and Horsley Wood units

External links
 Natural England (SSSI information)

Sites of Special Scientific Interest in Gloucestershire
Sites of Special Scientific Interest notified in 1966
Forests and woodlands of Gloucestershire
Cotswolds